Park Hills is a home rule-class city in Kenton County, Kentucky, United States. The population was 3,162 at the 2020 census. It is a suburb of the Cincinnati metropolitan area. Much of the city was listed on the National Register of Historic Places in 2008 as the Park Hills Historic District.

History
The area of present-day Park Hills was subdivided and settled  on land owned by Messrs. Coran, Corry, and Spencer. This community remained quite small until D. Collins Lee and Robert Simmons developed the area in 1926 and incorporated the present city the next year.

Geography
The city is part of the Bluegrass Region of the Commonwealth of Kentucky, part of the Upland South region of the United States.

Demographics

As of the census of 2000, there were 2,977 people, 1,382 households, and 725 families residing in the city. The racial makeup of the city was 96.64% White, 1.65% African American, 0.07% Native American, 0.77% Asian, 0.30% from other races, and 0.57% from two or more races. Hispanic or Latino of any race were 0.60% of the population.

There were 1,382 households, out of which 24.7% had children under the age of 18 living with them, 40.4% were married couples living together, 9.0% had a female householder with no husband present, and 47.5% were non-families. 40.3% of all households were made up of individuals, and 9.7% had someone living alone who was 65 years of age or older. The average household size was 2.08 and the average family size was 2.85.

In the city, the population was spread out, with 19.9% under the age of 18, 9.1% from 18 to 24, 33.2% from 25 to 44, 23.3% from 45 to 64, and 14.5% who were 65 years of age or older. The median age was 37 years. For every 100 females, there were 92.1 males. For every 100 females age 18 and over, there were 87.1 males.

The median income for a household in the city was $42,227, and the median income for a family was $65,833. Males had a median income of $39,450 versus $31,719 for females. The per capita income for the city was $29,486. About 2.8% of families and 5.3% of the population were below the poverty line, including 4.9% of those under age 18 and 4.7% of those age 65 or over.

Government
Park Hills is a home rule-class city. The city has a mayor who is elected every four years: the current mayor is Kathy Zembrodt. The city has a six-member City Council that is elected every two years. Current City Council Members are:

 Joe Shields
 Steve Elkins
 Kevin Theissen
 Sara Froelich
 Pam Spoor
 Wesley Deters

Park Hills is represented in the Kentucky General Assembly by Senator Christian McDaniel (R) of the 23rd District in the Senate and by Representative Charles "Buddy" Wheatley (D) of the 65th District and Representative Kim Banta (R) of the 63rd District in the House of Representatives.

Park Hills is located in Kentucky's 4th Congressional District, currently  represented in the 113th United States Congress by Thomas Massie (R).

Education

Public schools
The city is served by the Kenton County School District. Students from Park Hills attend Dixie Heights High School in grades 9 through 12, Turkey Foot Middle School in grades 6 through 8, and Fort Wright Elementary in grades Pre-K through 5.

Private schools
There are two private Catholic schools within the community, Covington Catholic High School and Notre Dame Academy.  Covington Catholic is all male and Notre Dame is all female, both schools are run by the Diocese of Covington and their Department of Catholic Schools. The Diocese runs 17 schools in Kenton County.

References

External links
 City of Park Hills Official Website
 Wartman, Scot. "Will a Traditional Catholic church change this small town?", Cincinnati Enquirer, August 8, 2017

Cities in Kenton County, Kentucky
Cities in Kentucky
Populated places established in 1927
1927 establishments in Kentucky